Nauruan parliamentary election, 2010 can refer to:

 April 2010 Nauruan parliamentary election
 June 2010 Nauruan parliamentary election